Portugal participated in the Eurovision Song Contest 2004 with the song "Foi magia" written by Paulo Neves. The song was performed by Sofia Vitória. The Portuguese broadcaster Rádio e Televisão de Portugal (RTP) organised the national final Festival da Canção 2004 in order to select the Portuguese entry for the 2004 contest in Istanbul, Turkey. The competition consisted of two shows on 18 and 25 January 2004 where the winner was selected exclusively by public televoting. "Foi magia" performed by Sofia Vitória emerged as the winner with 39,072 votes.

Portugal competed in the semi-final of the Eurovision Song Contest which took place on 12 May 2004. Performing during the show in position 7, "Foi magia" was not announced among the top 10 entries of the semi-final and therefore did not qualify to compete in the final. It was later revealed that Portugal placed fifteenth out of the 22 participating countries in the semi-final with 38 points.

Background 
Prior to the 2004 contest, Portugal had participated in the Eurovision Song Contest thirty-seven times since its first entry in 1964. The nation's highest placing in the contest was sixth, which they achieved in 1996 with the song "O meu coração não tem cor" performed by Lúcia Moniz. Portugal's least successful result has been last place, which they have achieved on three occasions, most recently in 1997 with the song "Antes do adeus" performed by Célia Lawson. Portugal has also received nul points on two occasions; in 1964 and 1997. The nation placed twenty-second with the song "Deixa-me sonhar" performed by Rita Guerra in 2003.

The Portuguese national broadcaster, Rádio e Televisão de Portugal (RTP), broadcasts the event within Portugal and organises the selection process for the nation's entry. RTP confirmed Portugal's participation in the 2004 Eurovision Song Contest on 29 September 2003. The broadcaster has traditionally selected the Portuguese entry for the Eurovision Song Contest via the music competition Festival da Canção, with an exception in 1988 when the Portuguese entry was internally selected. Along with their participation confirmation, the broadcaster revealed details regarding their selection procedure and announced that the selection of the 2004 Portuguese entry would involve the reality singing competition Operação Triunfo.

Before Eurovision

Festival da Canção 2004 
Festival da Canção 2004 was the 41st edition of Festival da Canção that selected Portugal's entry for the Eurovision Song Contest 2004. Three entries competed in the competition that consisted of two shows held during the second season of the reality singing competition Operação Triunfo on 18 and 25 January 2004. Both shows took place at the Endemol TV Studios in Mem-Martins, hosted by Catarina Furtado and broadcast on RTP1 and RTP Internacional.

Competing entries 
The top three contestants of the second season of Operação Triunfo: Francisco Andrade, Gonçalo Medeiros and Sofia Vitória, were selected for the competition and were each assigned a potential Eurovision Song Contest song selected by a jury panel consisting of lyricist Rosa Lobato de Faria, Portuguese Eurovision 1968 and 1972 entrant Carlos Mendes, journalist and music critic Nuno Galopim and producers José Marinho and Nuno Figueira from 300 submissions received by Portuguese composers. The competing entries were revealed on 11 January 2004.

Final 
The final consisted of two shows on 18 and 25 January 2004. The first show on 18 January was an introductory show where the three entries were presented to the public and Portuguese Eurovision 1993 entrant Anabela and Portuguese Eurovision 1996 entrant Lúcia Moniz performed as the interval acts. The public was able to vote for their favourite songs until the second show on 25 January, during which the winner, "Foi magia" performed by Sofia Vitória, was selected solely by the public televote. Pedro Abrunhosa performed as the interval act and each of the competing artists performed a cover version of a former Portuguese Eurovision song in a duet with its original performer.

At Eurovision 

It was announced that the competition's format would be expanded to include a semi-final in 2004. According to the rules, all nations with the exceptions of the host country, the "Big Four" (France, Germany, Spain and the United Kingdom), and the ten highest placed finishers in the 2003 contest are required to qualify from the semi-final on 12 May 2004 in order to compete for the final on 15 May 2004; the top ten countries from the semi-final progress to the final. On 23 March 2004, a special allocation draw was held which determined the running order for the semi-final and Portugal was set to perform in position 7, following the entry from Andorra and before the entry from Malta. At the end of the semi-final, Portugal was not announced among the top 10 entries in the semi-final and therefore failed to qualify to compete in the final. It was later revealed that Portugal placed fifteenth in the semi-final, receiving a total of 38 points.

In Portugal, the two shows were broadcast on RTP1 and RTP Internacional with commentary by Eládio Clímaco. The Portuguese spokesperson, who announced the Portuguese votes during the final, was Isabel Angelino.

Voting 
Below is a breakdown of points awarded to Portugal and awarded by Portugal in the semi-final and grand final of the contest. The nation awarded its 12 points to Ukraine in the semi-final and to Spain in the final of the contest.

Points awarded to Portugal

Points awarded by Portugal

References

External links
 Official Festival da Canção site

2004
Countries in the Eurovision Song Contest 2004
Eurovision